The Cloke Plaza bell is a bell located on the University of Maine campus in Orono, Maine in the Cloke Plaza. It is located near Neville Hall, Barrows Hall, and the East Annex Building. The bell rings every hour on the hour, the number of rings corresponding to the hour. The bell that was used is called the Wingate bell and was a bell that had been previously in use on the University of Maine Orono campus at Wingate Hall.
This was also the site of an accident reported in the Bangor Daily News in 2009.

References

Buildings and structures at the University of Maine
Individual bells in the United States